Echo Township may refer to one of the following places in the United States:

 Echo Township, Michigan
 Echo Township, Minnesota

Township name disambiguation pages